Ysgol Gyfun Aberaeron is a bilingual comprehensive school for pupils aged between 11 and 18 years. The school is situated in the town of Aberaeron in Ceredigion, Wales. The school had 599 pupils on roll in 2020.

34% of pupils are from homes in which Welsh is the main language. However, 70% of pupils speak Welsh as a first language or to an equal standard. As of 2016, over 80% of pupils in Year 10 and Year 11 study at least three examination subjects through the medium of Welsh.

The school ranked very low in the Welsh league tables (153rd out of 217 schools in Wales) in 2013. The school reached first position in the Western Mail league tables the following year (2014). The school achieved a 5 star rating (the highest possible ranking) for teaching; attainment and finance. According to the paper the “School’s mission to ‘provide a inclusive centre of excellence within a bilingual community’ has doubtless been achieved.”

Notable former pupils
 Alana Spencer (born 1992), winner of BBC's The Apprentice series 12
 Seirian Sumner - Professor of entomology at UCL

References 

Secondary schools in Ceredigion
Aberaeron